The 1903 Massillon Tigers football season  was their first season in existence. The team finished with a record of 8–1 and won the Ohio League championship. The Tigers began as an amateur team, however after their roster was decimated by injuries, the team paid several professional football players from western Pennsylvania to play for them against the Akron East Ends for the championship game. The Tigers would remain a professional team for the rest of their existence.

Schedule

Game notes

References

Massillon Tigers seasons
1903 in sports in Ohio
Massillon Tigers